Chachoki  is a village in Phagwara Tehsil in Kapurthala district of Punjab State, India. The village is administrated by a Sarpanch, who is an elected representative.

Demography 
According to the report published by Census India in 2011, Chachoki has 958 houses with the total population of 4,307 persons of which 2,310 are male and 1,997 females.  The population of children in the age group 0–6 years is 501.

Population data

Transport 
Phagwara Junction Railway Station and Mauli Halt Railway Station are the closest railway stations to Chachoki; however, Jalandhar City Rail Way station is 24 km away from the village.  The village is 119 km away from Sri Guru Ram Dass Jee International Airport in Amritsar and the other nearest airport is Sahnewal Airport  in Ludhiana, which is located 38 km away from the village.

See also
 Sohan Qadri

References

External links
  Villages in Kapurthala
 Kapurthala Villages List

Villages in Kapurthala district